The New Hampshire Division of Economic Development (DED) is a government agency of the U.S. state of New Hampshire. The agency's headquarters are located in Concord.

History
New Hampshire has had a Division of Economic Development since 1962. During the 1960s, the division published vacation guides and placed newspaper advertisements with taglines such as "The New New Hampshire". During the 1970s, the division issued state highway maps and tourist guides. Similar activities are now handled by the state's Division of Travel and Tourism Development.

In July 2017, the Division of Economic Development became part of the newly formed Department of Business and Economic Affairs (DBEA), having previously been part of the state's Department of Resources and Economic Development (DRED).

Function
The division assists businesses looking to move to the state, start in the state, or grow within the state. Activities include assisting businesses in obtaining permits to operate in New Hampshire, and co-working with financial services groups to help businesses expand. The division also operates an Office of International Commerce (OIC).

References

External links

New Hampshire Division of Economic Development works at WorldCat

Economic Development
Government agencies established in 1962
1962 establishments in New Hampshire